Big Ain't Bad is a romantic comedy film, directed by Ray Culpepper and written by Brian Poe (aka Drayton Jamison). It stars Sean Blakemore (2016 Daytime Emmy Winner as Outstanding Actor in a Supporting role on ABC-TV's General Hospital), Jade Jenise Dixon, Reginald Ballard, Tico Wells, and Troy Medley. The film won the Audience Choice Award at the 2003 Hollywood Black Film Festival in Los Angeles, California.  It was the Kick Off Film to the Fox Theater's 75th Anniversary Summer Film Series in Atlanta in 2004.  It played in limited release in movie theaters, and was released to DVD (First Look) in 2005.

Plot
Big Ain't Bad is a romantic comedy that redefines the measure of love. Ric (Blakemore) and Natalie (Dixon) are a happy young couple headed towards marriage after a brief courtship. However, when Natalie makes an early return home from a business trip and finds her trusted mate in the company of last night's entertainment, the relationship abruptly ends leaving them to travel separate roads to self-discovery.

Cast
Jade Jenise Dixon as Natalie Wilkins
Sean Blakemore as Ric Jackson
Reginald Ballard as Butch Wilkins
Tico Wells as Kirkland Ellis III
Troy Medley as Dino "Mobe" Wilkins
Cory Tyler as Pierre
Hattie Lemon as Marilyn
Jemmerio Is Jemmerio as Fats
Kenny Leon as Mayor Thomas Jordan
Montanna Taylor as Denver
Phyllis Yvonne Stickney as Lauren Jordan
Sahr Ngaujah as Clay
Syr Law as Marci
Tracie Wright as Gina
Tracy Johnson as Tiny
Therese Dray-Jones as Sabrina 
Angel Glaspie as Cashier 
Bernard Holyfield as Quincy 
Janora McDuffie as Keli 
Aimee Palance as Mia 
Xavier Rivers as Curator 
Malcolm Spears as Spencer 
Frank Ski as Lead MC
Rashan Ali as Rae Vaughn
Jason Carter as MC
Jace C. Gatewood as Butch Wilkins, Sr.
Isaiah Thomas as Young Dino Wilkins
Cameron Witherspoon as Young Natalie Wilkins
Ryann Poe as Child in Rain Scene
Lil Jon as himself

References

External links
 

2002 films
2002 romantic comedy films
African-American romantic comedy films
2000s English-language films
2000s American films